Kalinka  is a village in the administrative district of Gmina Jabłoń, within Parczew County, Lublin Voivodeship, in eastern Poland.

References

Kalinka